Pandit Lakshmi Kanta Maitra was an Indian politician. He was a Member of Parliament, representing Nabadwip, West Bengal in the Lok Sabha the lower house of India's Parliament as a member of the Indian National Congress. He was also a member of the Constituent Assembly of India.

References

1895 births
Year of death missing
Lok Sabha members from West Bengal
India MPs 1952–1957
Indian National Congress politicians
Members of the Constituent Assembly of India